Hauericeras is an ammonite genus from the Late Cretaceous that lived from the Coniacian to the late Maastrichtian, from about 90 to 66 mya. Fossils have been found in Europe, Russia, South Africa, Australia, India, Iraq, and in the United States.

The shell of Haericeras is subinvolute with the outer whorl covering much of the inner, but leaving  part of the inner whorls exposed. Whorls are smooth with narrow periodic constructions.  Whorl section is laterally compressed, flanks gently bowed, venter sharp.  The suture is strongly ammonitic.

The genus Oiophyllites may be related.

Species
 Hauericeras gardeni
 Hauericeras pseudogardeni
 Hauericeras sulcatum

References
W. Arkell et al., 1957. Mesozoic Ammonoidea, Treatise on Invertebrate Paleontology, Part L.  Geological Society of America and University of Kansas Press.
Paleobiology Database
Sepkoski's Online Genus Database

Cretaceous ammonites
Ammonitida genera
Desmoceratidae
Cretaceous animals of Asia